Alatococcus is a genus of flowering plants belonging to the family Sapindaceae.

Its native range is Southeastern Brazil.

Species:

Alatococcus siqueirae

References

Sapindaceae
Sapindaceae genera